Bethany Lee McLean (born December 12, 1970) is an American journalist and contributing editor for Vanity Fair magazine. She is known for her writing on the Enron scandal and the 2008 financial crisis. Previous assignments include editor-at-large, columnist for Fortune, and a contributor to Slate.

Early life and education 
McLean was born in Hibbing, Minnesota on December 12, 1970. McLean graduated from Hibbing High School in 1988. In 1992 she received a B.A. in English and mathematics from Williams College.

Career 
McLean started her career as an investment banking analyst for Goldman Sachs and joined Vanity Fair as a contributing editor in 2008.  She began as a contributor to Slate's Moneybox column, in 2010 and "The Bulldog" column in Fortune. 

She authored an article on Enron for the March 5, 2001, issue of Fortune entitled, "Is Enron Overpriced?" The article noted some irregularities in Enron's financial documents that were available to the public, suggesting the company's then-record high stock price was unjustified but she did not at that point suspect fraud at Enron. After Enron's rapid collapse later in 2001, McLean co-authored the book The Smartest Guys in the Room (2003) which detailed the corrupt business practices of Enron officials.  The book was later made into the Academy Award-nominated documentary Enron: The Smartest Guys in the Room.

In 2005, McLean got into a spat with then-CEO of Overstock.com Patrick M. Byrne after she wrote a negative article about Overstock and him.

She co-authored a book on the 2008 financial crisis titled All the Devils Are Here.

In September 2015, she published Shaky Ground: The Strange Saga of the U.S. Mortgage Giants which examines the governance and financial situation of Fannie Mae and Freddie Mac seven years after the 2008 financial crisis. The Washington Post selected it as one of the best nonfiction books of 2015.

In September 2018, she published Saudi America: The Truth about Fracking and How It's Changing the World which examined the "fracking revolution" and U.S. energy independence.
In 2019, Mclean launched a podcast titled Making a Killing on Luminary.

Personal life 
McLean married Chris Wilford in 2000 and divorced in 2006. In May 2008, she married attorney Sean Berkowitz, the former Director of the United States Department of Justice Enron Task Force. They divorced in 2020. McLean resides in Chicago with her children.

Bibliography

Books

Essays and reporting

References

External links 

Bethany McLean on Twitter

1970 births
Living people
American business writers
Women business writers
American women journalists
People from Hibbing, Minnesota
Vanity Fair (magazine) people
Williams College alumni
21st-century American women